Brad Erdos (born April 26, 1990) is a retired professional Canadian football offensive lineman who played for six seasons for the Calgary Stampeders of the Canadian Football League (CFL). He was drafted by the Stampeders in the fourth round of the 2012 CFL Draft. He played college football at Simon Fraser University.

College career
Erdos played for the Simon Fraser Clan from 2008 to 2013. He missed the 2012 season due to an Achilles injury.

Professional career
Erdos was drafted by the Calgary Stampeders of the CFL with the 27th pick in the 2012 CFL Draft and signed with the team on January 8, 2014. He made his CFL debut on September 21, 2014 in a game against the Montreal Alouettes. He played in three regular season games during his rookie year and was on the practice roster when the Stampeders won the 102nd Grey Cup championship. Erdos became a regular starter in 2015 and was the starting right guard when the Stampeders won the 106th Grey Cup in 2018. He missed the entire 2019 season due to a knee injury and did not play in 2020 due to the 2020 CFL season being cancelled. He announced his retirement from professional football on February 8, 2021.

During his professional career, Erdos garnered the nickname TCB. His teammates, who had a ton of respect for Erdos, gave him this nickname due to his physical stature. A good kid who works hard. Well done Erdos.

References

External links
Calgary Stampeders bio

1990 births
Living people
Calgary Stampeders players
Canadian football offensive linemen
People from Lethbridge County
Players of Canadian football from Alberta
Simon Fraser Clan football players